The Jensen 541S was Jensen Motors luxury GT model of the Jensen 541. Announced in mid-October 1960, the Jensen 541S was four inches wider than the 541R. The increased track allowed the new car's interior to be roomier and improved the roadholding. The 541S had a conventional radiator grill (as opposed to the flap of the 541) to allow for the extra heat given by a proposed new V8 engine, and a Salisbury limited slip differential for the extra torque demanded..

Jensen used their own powerful version of the Austin DS5 4-litre straight-six engine (featuring triple H4 type SU carburettors, a high compression Weslake head with custom-made twin exhaust manifolds and an alloy baffled sump/oil cooler) in the 541S. Initially the Jensen brothers tested Chrysler Hemi V8s in the 541S, also trialled in Alan Jensen's Jensen 541delux, but none were used because of supply difficulties. One was fitted with a  Chevrolet 327 V8 however, at Donald Healey's request. A total of 127 cars were hand-built between 1960 and 1962 at Jensen's West Bromwich factory, most having GM-licensed Rolls-Royce hydramatic gearboxes. This was innovative at the time as performance cars mainly had manual gearboxes. It also suited the criteria of effortless speed and luxurious long distance driving Jensen set for their new car, although twenty-two were fitted with Moss manual gear boxes at the request of their prospective owners.

The Jensen 541S is also notable for being the first British car to have seat belts fitted as standard equipment. Another first for the 541 series was the use of Dunlop disc brakes on all four wheels. A rack and pinion steering system was employed, giving the car very positive steering.  Other safety equipment included a padded windscreen surround, fire extinguisher and first-aid kit. Each car was also fitted with a Motorola radio.

The 541 S was superseded by the Chrysler Golden Commando V8 powered Jensen C-V8 model, which inherited from the 541 S the same wheelbase and track dimensions, as well as the Jensen ethos of safe, easy, comfortable and fast inter-continental travel while the groundbreaking 1966 Jensen FF used a  perimeter tube style chassis first tried on the 541 series of cars.

Gallery

Further reading
An article with photographs by John Neville Cohen about the rare 541S manual drive (only 22 made) https://www.jncohen.net/Jensen/article.htm

References

541S
Rear-wheel-drive vehicles
Grand tourers
Cars introduced in 1960